Three Hours to Love is a 1968 Yugoslav film directed by Fadil Hadžić.

External links

Three Hours to Love at Filmski-Programi.hr 

1968 films
Croatian romantic drama films
Yugoslav romantic drama films
Jadran Film films
Films directed by Fadil Hadžić